Lagenorhynchus is a genus of oceanic dolphins in the infraorder Cetacea, presently containing six extant species. However, there is consistent molecular evidence that the genus is polyphyletic and several of the species are likely to be moved to other genera. In addition, the extinct species Lagenorhynchus harmatuki is also classified in this genus.

Etymology 
The name Lagenorhynchus derives from the Greek lagenos meaning "bottle" and rhynchus meaning "beak". Indeed, the "bottle-nose" is a characteristic of this genus. However, the dolphins popularly called bottlenose dolphins belong in the genus Tursiops.

Taxonomy 
There is compelling evidence from molecular phylogeny that the genus Lagenorhynchus is polyphyletic, meaning that it currently contains several species that are not closely related.
 found that the white-beaked and Atlantic white-sided dolphins are phylogenetically isolated within the Delphinidae, where they are believed to be rather basal members of the family Delphinidae, together with the killer whale (subfamily Orcininae).

The remaining four species of Lagenorhynchus: Pacific white-sided dolphin, Peale's dolphin, hourglass dolphin and dusky dolphin consistently appear nested within the Lissodelphininae subfamily in studies of molecular phylogeny, together with the Right whale dolphins and the four species of the genus Cephalorhynchus (including Hector's dolphin). Some authors have suggested that these four species are placed in the resurrected genus Sagmatias. 
However, other molecular studies recover the hourglass and Peale's dolphins as nested phylogenetically within the four species of Cephalorhynchus and thereby speaks against inclusion in a new genus together with Pacific white-sided dolphin and dusky dolphin. This phylogeny is supported by acoustic and morphological data. Both hourglass and Peale's dolphins share with the species of Cephalorhynchus a distinct type of echolocation signal known as a narrow-band, high-frequency signal. This signal is shared with porpoises (Phocoenidae) and pygmy sperm whales (Kogiidae), but is not found among other dolphin groups. Presumably this is the case for hourglass dolphins, as well. Peale's dolphin also shares with several Cephalorhynchus species the possession of a distinct white "armpit" marking behind the pectoral fin.

The melon-headed whale was first classified as member of the genus Lagenorhynchus, but was later moved to its own genus, Peponocephala.

Notes

References

 
 
 
 
 

 
Cetacean genera
Animals that use echolocation
Taxa named by John Edward Gray